The Baylor–Texas Tech football rivalry is an American college football rivalry between the Baylor Bears and Texas Tech Red Raiders. Each school is a member of the Big 12 Conference. The rivalry began in 1929. The game has been played every year since 1956 despite the fact that Texas Tech was a member of the Border Intercollegiate Athletic Conference. In 1960, Texas Tech joined the Southwest Conference, ensuring the rivalry would continue. In 1996, the Southwest Conference dissolved, and both teams were invited, along with the Texas Longhorns and Texas A&M Aggies, with former members of the Big Eight Conference to form the Big 12 Conference. From 1947–64, Baylor won 14 of the 15 games. From 1996–2010, Texas Tech won 15 straight games. Baylor then won 5 straight meetings.

This rivalry has been nicknamed the "Texas Shootout" or some call it the "Butt Bowl" because whenever Baylor plays on the road or at a neutral site, the teams' abbreviated names read BU-TT.

Texas Farm Bureau Insurance Shootout
In 2009, the game was held at AT&T Stadium (then Cowboy Stadium), the first time in the series the match-up was held on a neutral site. The game was the highest attended in the series' history, with 71,964 in attendance.

After the 2010 game was held at the Cotton Bowl in Fair Park, Dallas during the State Fair of Texas, the series returned to AT&T Stadium for the 2011 to 2017 games. The two schools finalized a contract that extended the series there through 2018. Starting in 2019 however, the series will switch to campus sites, with Baylor hosting Texas Tech in 2019 in Waco and the Red Raiders hosting the Bears in 2020 in Lubbock.

Game results

See also  
 List of NCAA college football rivalry games

References

College football rivalries in the United States
Baylor Bears football
Texas Tech Red Raiders football
1929 establishments in Texas